Lama Rabi Rabi is an album by the band Ghost. Drag City released the album in 1996, the first time a Ghost album had been issued by an American label.

Critical reception

The Austin Chronicle wrote: "Highlights include the acid-psych mantra 'Rabirabi' and the fleeting, phantasmal folk of 'Into the Alley', eclipsed only by 11-minute crescendo 'Agate Scape'." Spin noted that "you can hear psychedelia, vocals fed through a megaphone, a folk tune interrupted by studio phasing, even hints of a power ballad." The Staten Island Advance determined that "whirling, chant-driven, progressive-rockers lead way to a beautifully rolling folk-rock, recalling an amalgamation of Quicksilver Messenger Service, Incredible String Band, Flying Saucer Attacks and Pink Floyd."

AllMusic wrote that "the lengthy, fascinating 'Mastillah' starts Lama on a striking high, with a series of percussive instruments meshed with acoustic drones and low, wordless mantras, leading to a steady rhythm pace."

Track listing
 "Masttillah" - 8:03
 "RabiRabi" - 7:32
 "Into the Alley" - 4:37
 "Marrakech" - 5:18
 "Who Found a Lost Rose in the Warship?" - 3:11
 "Mex Square Blue" - 4:14
 "My Hump is a Shell" - 1:44
 "Bad Bone" - 4:17
 "Abyssinia" - 3:36
 "Agate Scape" - 10:49
 "Summer's Ashen Fable" - 6:04

Personnel
Taishi Takizawa
Junichi Yamamoto
Iwao Yamazaki
Kazuo Ogino
Michio Kurihara
Masaki Batoh

References

1996 albums
Ghost (1984 band) albums
Drag City (record label) albums